Andrey Viktaravich Skorabahatska (born 19 July 1968) is a Belarusian professional football coach and a former player.

He has formerly played for Belarusian Club Dnepr Mogilev, MPKC Mozyr, Transmash Mogilev, Torpedo-Kadino Mogilev and FC Gomel.

Coaching career
Skorabahatska started coaching in 2004, in his country. On 8 August 2008 he was appointed the manager of Belarusian Premier League team Dnepr Mogilev, where he worked until 2011.
In 2013–2014 he was a head coach for Minsk.

In January 2018, Skorabahatska joined the technical staff of Georgi Kondratiev at FC Belshina Bobruisk. On 8 February 2019, he was appointed as manager of Belarus national under-17 football team.

Honours
MPKC Mozyr
 Belarusian Premier League champion: 1996
 Belarusian Cup winner: 1995–96

Individual
 Belarusian Premier League top scorer: 1992

References

External links
 

1968 births
Living people
Belarusian people of Ukrainian descent
Footballers from Zaporizhzhia
Soviet footballers
Belarusian footballers
Association football forwards
Belarusian Premier League players
FC Dnepr Mogilev players
FC Slavia Mozyr players
FC Transmash Mogilev players
FC Torpedo Mogilev players
FC Gomel players
Belarusian football managers
FC Torpedo Mogilev managers
FC Dnepr Mogilev managers
FC Kommunalnik Slonim managers
FC Minsk managers